Sylhet is a north-eastern city of Bangladesh. It is also the divisional headquarters of Sylhet division. With more than 1.2 million population, the city is one of the largest in Bangladesh.

Tallest buildings
This lists ranks buildings in Sylhet based on their official height. All the buildings listed below rise at least  from the ground. They are either completed or Topped-out. An equals sign (=) following a rank indicates the same height between two or more buildings. The "Year" column indicates the year in which a building was completed.

Buildings above 60m

Tallest Under Construction

See also
 List of tallest buildings in Bangladesh
 List of tallest buildings in Dhaka
List of tallest buildings in Chittagong
 List of tallest buildings and structures in South Asia
 List of tallest buildings in Asia
 List of tallest buildings in the World
 List of tallest structures in the world

References

Buildings and structures in Sylhet
Sylhet